Angel Seed XXIII is the fourth studio album by the industrial metal band Skrew. It was released in 1997 through Metal Blade Records.

Track listing

Personnel 
Skrew
Mark Frappier – bass guitar
Adam Grossman – vocals, guitar, production, mixing, design
Chris Istas – drums, percussion
Jason Lindgren – guitar, vocals
Jim Vollentine – percussion, vocals, programming, production, engineering, mixing, design
Production and additional personnel
Barbara Arriaga – cello
Tom Baker – mastering
Doug C. – guitar
H.A. Clough – piano
Kathryn Kinslow – photography
Mahrla Manning – bagpipes
Bill Metoyer – production, engineering, mixing

References

External links 
 

1997 albums
Metal Blade Records albums
Skrew albums